Ryan Hodgskin (born 30 March 1977) is a South African former professional footballer who played as a right back.

Career
Born in Johannesburg, Hodgskin played in the Premier Soccer League for Wits University and Jomo Cosmos.

References 

1977 births
Living people
South African soccer players
Bidvest Wits F.C. players
Jomo Cosmos F.C. players
Association football fullbacks
Soccer players from Johannesburg
White South African people